Solomonilla is a genus of flies in the family Tachinidae.

Species
Solomonilla mirabilis (Baranov, 1938)

Distribution
Solomon Islands.

References

Insects of the Solomon Islands
Endemic fauna of the Solomon Islands
Diptera of Australasia
Dexiinae
Tachinidae genera
Monotypic Brachycera genera